This is a list of public holidays in Jersey.

References

Jersey
Events in Jersey
Jersey